Laura Irwin Langbein is a quantitative methodologist and professor of public administration and policy at American University in Washington, D.C. She teaches quantitative methods, program evaluation, policy analysis, and public choice. Her articles have appeared in journals on politics, economics, policy analysis and public administration.

Langbein received a BA in government from Oberlin College in 1965 and a PhD in political science from the University of North Carolina at Chapel Hill in 1972. She has taught at American University since 1973: until 1978 as an assistant professor in the School of Government and Public Administration; from 1978 to 1983 as an associate professor in the School of Government and Public Administration; and since 1983 as a professor in the School of Public Affairs. She is also a private consultant on statistics, research design, survey research, and program evaluation and an accomplished clarinetist.

In August 2010, her article in International Public Management Journal received a best paper award and her Social Science Quarterly article on same-sex marriage, co-authored by Mark Yost, was cited in the Proposition 8 decision by a U.S. District Court in San Francisco, California.

Selected published works

 
 
 
 
  Policy Research Working Paper WPS4669.
  Invited Comment: Point and Counterpoint on the Role of Random Assignment in Social Policy Research.

References

External links
Capitol Alert: Read the decision overturning Proposition 8
International Public Management Network

Living people
1940s births
American University faculty and staff
Oberlin College alumni
University of North Carolina at Chapel Hill alumni
American women political scientists
American political scientists
American political writers
American women academics
21st-century American women